Aleksey Khatylyov (born 17 July 1983) is a Belarusian speed skater. He competed in three events at the 2002 Winter Olympics.

References

1983 births
Living people
Belarusian male speed skaters
Olympic speed skaters of Belarus
Speed skaters at the 2002 Winter Olympics
Place of birth missing (living people)